The 2007 NC State Wolfpack football team represented North Carolina State University during the 2007 NCAA Division I FBS football season. The team's head coach was Tom O'Brien.  NC State has been a member of the Atlantic Coast Conference (ACC) since the league's inception in 1953, and has participated in that conference's Atlantic Division since 2005. The Wolfpack played its home games in 2007 at Carter–Finley Stadium in Raleigh, North Carolina, which has been NC State football's home stadium since 1966.

Schedule

References

NC State
NC State Wolfpack football seasons
NC State Wolfpack football